Pompeyo Antonio Davalillo Romero [da-va-LEE-yo] (June 30, 1931 – February 28, 2013) was a Venezuelan professional baseball player and minor league manager. He played in Major League Baseball as a shortstop for the Washington Senators.

Career
Davalillo was drafted by the New York Yankees in 1953 and later transferred to the Washington Senators. At the age of 25, he made his major league debut with the Senators on August 1, 1953, becoming only the fourth Venezuelan to play in Major League Baseball after Alex Carrasquel (1939), Chucho Ramos (1944) and Chico Carrasquel (1950). He had a promising future, but his aversion to airplane travel, combined with a severe injury, curtailed his career in the major leagues.

Davalillo played eleven seasons in minor league baseball, nine of them at Triple-A level, and posted a .270 average in 1,207 games. He also played in Mexico (1962–64) and spent fourteen seasons with the Leones del Caracas of the Venezuelan Winter League (1952–53 and 1965–66).  He is the second-smallest player in major league baseball history.  The shortest player on record is 43-inch Eddie Gaedel, who got one plate appearance (a walk) as a 1951 publicity stunt. Five players listed at 5-3 have graced the major leagues since 1900, according to Baseball Reference, with Pompeyo Davalillo, Jess Cortazzo, Bob Emmerich, Stubby Magner and Mike McCormack combining for 90 hits in 463 at-bats".

Career statistics
In a 19-game major league career, Davalillo had 17 hits in 58 at bats for a .293 career batting average along with 2 runs batted in, 1 stolen base and scored 10 runs. He had a .305 on-base percentage along with a .935 fielding percentage. In 469 Venezuelan Winter League games, he was a .276 hitter with three home runs and 130 RBI, including 246 runs, 58 doubles, 19 triples and 67 stolen bases.

Coaching career and honors
After his playing career had ended, Davalillo became a coach and a manager in the Venezuelan league.

Davalillo was inducted into the Venezuelan Baseball Hall of Fame and Museum in 2006. His younger brother Vic Davalillo, also played in Major League Baseball.

See also
List of players from Venezuela in Major League Baseball

Notes

References
, or Venezuelan Professional Baseball League

1931 births
2013 deaths
Anaheim Angels scouts
California Angels scouts
Caribbean Series managers
Charlotte Hornets (baseball) players
Havana Sugar Kings players
Jersey City Jerseys players
Leones del Caracas players
Louisville Colonels (minor league) players
Major League Baseball players from Venezuela
Major League Baseball shortstops
Miami Marlins (IL) players
Minor league baseball managers
Mexican League baseball managers
People from Cabimas
Tigres del México players
Tigres de Salamanca players
Venezuelan expatriate baseball players in Mexico
Venezuelan expatriate baseball players in the United States
Washington Senators (1901–1960) players
Venezuelan expatriate baseball players in Cuba